Sir Ernest John Pickstone Benn, 2nd Baronet,  (25 June 1875 – 17 January 1954) was a British publisher, writer and political publicist. His father, John Benn, was a politician, who had been made a baronet in 1914. He was an uncle of the Labour politician Tony Benn.

Biography
Benn was born in Oxted, Surrey. He attended the Central Foundation Boys' School. As a civil servant in the Ministry of Munitions and Reconstruction during the First World War he came to believe in the benefits of state intervention in the economy. In the mid-1920s, however, he changed his mind and adopted "the principles of undiluted laissez-faire".

From his conversion to classical liberalism in the mid-1920s until his death in 1954 Benn published more than twenty books and an equivalent amount of pamphlets propagating his ideas. His The Confessions of a Capitalist was originally published in 1925 and was still in print twenty years later after selling a quarter of a million copies. In it, he rejected the labour theory of value and argued that wealth is a by-product of exchange.

Benn admired Samuel Smiles and in a letter to The Times Benn claimed ideological descent from leading classical liberals:

In the ideal state of affairs, no one would record a vote in an election until he or she had read the eleven volumes of Jeremy Bentham and the whole of the works of John Stuart Mill, Herbert Spencer and Bastiat as well as Morley's Life of Cobden.

Benn was also a member of the Reform Club and a founder of what would become the Society for Individual Freedom.

Family
Benn married at the parish church, Edgbaston, on 3 January 1903 Gwendoline Dorothy Andrews. Their son John Andrews Benn (1904–1984) succeeded as 3rd Baronet.

Ernest Benn Limited

Benn was also a principal and manager of the publishing firm Benn Brothers, later Ernest Benn, Ltd.

Quotes
"Politics is the art of looking for trouble, finding it whether it exists or not, diagnosing it incorrectly, and applying the wrong remedies."

This quote is often misattributed to Groucho Marx, with slightly different wording ("Politics is the art of looking for trouble; finding it everywhere, diagnosing it wrongly, and applying unsuitable remedies").

Books
The Trade of To-morrow, (London: Jarrolds Publishers (London) Limited, 1917; New York: E. P. Dutton & Co., 1918)
The Trade as a Science (London: Jarrold & Sons, ca. 1917)
Trade Parliaments and their Work (London: Nisbet & Co. Ltd., 1918)
The Confessions of a Capitalist (London: Hutchinson, 1925; London: Ernest Benn Limited, 1948)
If I Were a Labour Leader (New York: C. Scribner's Sons, 1926)
The Return to Laisser Faire (New York: D. Appleton & Company, 1929)
About Russia (New York: D. Appleton and Co., 1930)
Debt (London: Ernest Benn Limited, 1938)
Happier Days: Recollections and Reflections (London: Ernest Benn Limited, 1949)
Governed to Death (London: Society of Individualists, 1948; New York: National Economic Council, 1949)
The State, the Enemy (London: Ernest Benn Limited, 1953)

Notes

Further reading
 Deryck Abel, Ernest Benn: Counsel for Liberty, London: Ernest Benn Ltd., 1960.

External links
Ernest Benn- biography and quotations
Catalogue of Benn's papers, held at the Modern Records Centre, University of Warwick
 

1875 births
1954 deaths
People from Oxted
People educated at Central Foundation Boys' School
Baronets in the Baronetage of the United Kingdom
British classical liberals
British book publishers (people)
High Sheriffs of the County of London
Commanders of the Order of the British Empire
Ernest